Brynjar Jökull Guðmundsson (born March 10, 1989 in Reykjavík) is an alpine skier from Iceland. Brynjar is due to compete for Iceland at the 2014 Winter Olympics in the slalom and giant slalom.

See also
Iceland at the 2014 Winter Olympics WM 2011 Garmis WM 2013 Schaldming

References

1989 births
Living people
Brynjar Gudmundsson
Brynjar Gudmundsson
Alpine skiers at the 2014 Winter Olympics
Brynjar Gudmundsson
21st-century Icelandic people